Purkhouti Muktangan, Naya Raipur is a  cultural and sculpture garden in Naya Raipur, Chhattisgarh, India. Established in 2006, it was inaugurated by former President A. P. J. Abdul Kalam. It gives a glimpse of Chhattisgarh's rich culture. This place displays the habitat, artifacts, folk dances, food habits of the tribal of the State. It also gives an insight into the crafts and arts of tribal of Chhattisgarh. It has a blissful garden houses the life-like figures of tribal performance, different folk arts that provide a wonderful perspective on the vibrant treasures of the Indian state of Chhattisgarh.

Gallery

References

Gardens in India
Buildings and structures in Chhattisgarh
2006 establishments in India